Carlos Caridad Montero (born 12 August 1967 in Maracaibo, Venezuela) is a Venezuelan film director, scriptwriter, and journalist, from the Escuela de Cine y Televisión de San Antonio de los Baños, Cuba. He now resides in Caracas.

His films include A los pobres les gusta el Mambo, Sólo Nosotros y los Dinosaurios, La Estrategia del Azar, Tarde de Machos, and Nocturno. Tarde de Machos was in the noncompetitive Tous les Cinémas du Monde of the 2006 Cannes Film Festival.

Filmography
Proyecto sobre Maracaibo (2007) (?) – Documentary
Nocturno (2003)
Tarde de Machos (2002)
La estrategia del Azar (1996)
Sólo Nosotros y los Dinosaurios (1993) – Documentary
A los pobres les gusta el Mambo (????)

References

External links
Nomenclatura Films
Página Oficial de Carlos Caridad Montero

People from Maracaibo
Venezuelan film directors
Venezuelan journalists
Venezuelan screenwriters
1967 births
Living people